Mehmood Anwar is a Pakistani politician who was a Member of the Provincial Assembly of the Punjab, from May 2013 to May 2018.

Early life and education
He was born on 18 November 1955 in Pattoki.

He has the degree of Bachelor of Arts.

Political career

He was elected to the Provincial Assembly of the Punjab as a candidate of Pakistan Muslim League (Nawaz) from Constituency PP-182 (Kasur-VIII) in 2013 Pakistani general election.

References

Living people
Punjab MPAs 2013–2018
1955 births
Pakistan Muslim League (N) politicians